Melbourne Shores is an unincorporated community in Brevard County, Florida, United States.  It is located on a barrier island southeast of the city of Melbourne and east of the town of Grant-Valkaria.  It is just north of the unincorporated community of Floridana Beach.

The community is part of the Palm Bay–Melbourne–Titusville Metropolitan Statistical Area.

References

Unincorporated communities in Brevard County, Florida
Unincorporated communities in Florida